The Treasure House is a cultural centre operated by the East Riding of Yorkshire Council in the town of Beverley in the East Riding of Yorkshire, England. The centre acts as the main hub for heritage and information services, and contains the East Riding Archives and Local Studies, the Beverley Library, a Museum and the Beverley Art Gallery. The building also contains a coffee lounge and gift shop. The top floor, known as 'The Tower', serves as an elevated sightseeing platform, showcasing 360 degree views of the Beverley Minster and the town of Beverley.

History 

The original library on Champney Road in Beverley had been built and completed in 1906. Initial plans were drawn up in 1997 for an extension to the building, beginning with consultations and preparatory work being carried out by the Beverley Town Council, Beverley Civic Society and national organisations such as English Heritage and the Royal Fine Arts Commission.

Work on The Treasure House started in October 2004, with local construction contractors Houlton engaging with archaeologists and the then Chairman of the East Riding of Yorkshire Council, Councillor Margaret Chapman. A time capsule was buried to mark the start of building work, with its contents reflecting life in the East Riding at that time. It was planned that the capsule would be resurrected in fifty years from its planting, intending to be brought out in 2054. Some of the items entered into it included contributions from local schools such as Longcroft School, with students producing coursework describing how they envisage the world to be in fifty years time. 

The initial completion date was stated as being autumn 2006, and it had been hoped that the building would open on the centenary of the opening of the library. Eventually, the building would be completed in 2007. The project had been funded through a grant of £3.9 million from the Heritage Lottery Fund.

Publicly accessible areas

Archives and Local Studies 

At the main entrance of the Treasure House, the research room of the East Riding archives and local studies can be found. Members of the public have access to all of the books, microfiche resources, archive newspapers, documents, pictures and rare books of the East Riding. Experienced archivists are also available to assist with searches. To the left of the research room, there is a conservation workshop where large gallery windows allow viewing of conservators restoring pictures, books and other documents.

Beverley Library 

At the end of the main corridor is the Beverley library, allowing access to all of the library resources including the lending and reference libraries, computers, newspapers and children's area.

Museum galleries 

On the first floor there is a museum display of 'East Riding Treasures'. In addition to displays on the geology, natural history, landscape and people, there is the South Cave Weapons Cache, a nationally important display of Iron Age swords. In this gallery, there are also interactive activities for children, including puzzles, dressing-up costumes and a drawing table. In a neighbouring corridor, there is a gallery of temporary museum displays, which are frequently-changing and are often prepared by local community groups, or touring exhibitions from national museums or galleries.

Beverley Art Gallery 

The first of two galleries displays pictures from a permanent collection. There is also a display chest which displays smaller themed collections. One of the main pictures on permanent display is The Panic, which is the world's largest cattle painting by popular English landscape and animal painter Henry William Banks Davis. The second of the two galleries has temporary art displays, which usually contain collections from either local artists, touring national exhibitions or displays from amateur art groups.

References

External links

 The Treasure House - East Riding of Yorkshire

Museums in the East Riding of Yorkshire
Beverley
Art museums and galleries in the East Riding of Yorkshire
Archives in the East Riding of Yorkshire